Jodi Lynn Picoult is an American writer. Picoult has published 28 novels, as well as short stories, and has also written several issues of Wonder Woman. Approximately 40 million copies of her books are in print worldwide, translated into 34 languages. She was awarded the New England Bookseller Award for fiction in 2003.

Picoult writes popular fiction which can be characterised as family saga. She frequently centers storylines on a moral dilemma or a procedural drama which pits family members against one another. She is often characterised as an author of chick-lit. Over her writing career, Picoult has covered a wide range of controversial or moral issues, including abortion, the Holocaust, assisted suicide, race relations, eugenics, LGBT rights, fertility issues, religion, the death penalty, and school shootings. She has been described as, "a paradox, a hugely popular, at times controversial writer, ignored by academia, who questions notions of what constitutes literature simply by doing what she does best."

Early life
Picoult was born in Nesconset, New York, on Long Island and has one younger brother. She graduated from Smithtown High School East in June, 1983. She has described her family as "non-practicing Jewish". Picoult wrote her first story at age five, titled "The Lobster Which Misunderstood". Picoult's mother and grandmother were both teachers, and she says that their influence on her was very important.

Education 
Picoult studied creative writing at Princeton University with Mary Morris, and graduated in 1987 with an A.B. in English after completing a 320-page-long senior thesis titled "Developments." She published two short stories in Seventeen magazine while still in college. Immediately after graduation, she began a variety of jobs, ranging from editing textbooks to teaching eighth-grade English. She earned a master's degree in education from Harvard University. Picoult has two honorary Doctor of Letters degrees; one from Dartmouth College in 2010, the other from the University of New Haven in 2012.

In 2016, Picoult was selected to be Princeton's Class Day Speaker before commencement.

Career
Picoult became the writer of the DC Comics series Wonder Woman (vol. 3), following the departure of Allan Heinberg. Her first issue (number 6) was released on March 28, 2007, and her last was issue number 10, released on June 27, 2007.

Nineteen Minutes, Picoult's novel about the aftermath of a school shooting in a small town, published on the 9th March 2007, was her first book to debut at number 1 on the New York Times best-seller list. Her book Change of Heart, published on March 4, 2008, was her second novel to debut at number 1 on that list. Handle with Care in 2009 and House Rules in 2010 also reached number 1 on the New York Times best-seller list.

Jodi Picoult is aware that she is often pigeon-holed as chick-lit author, but stated that what she loses in critical acclaim, she gains in influence: "I’m never going to win the Nobel prize for literature, not going to win a National Book award, never even going to be nominated. What you trade for that is sales and readership. And I would rather reach more people. It would be very nice to not be unfairly accused of being a bad writer, but hopefully if you do pick up one of my books, you will be quickly disabused of that notion."

In November 2019, Picoult participated in the criticism of Brooke Nelson, a college student who was mentioned in her local newspaper as saying she thought that author Sarah Dessen's YA novels were not suitable for the Common Read program run by Northern State University, Aberdeen, and had instead advocated for the inclusion of Just Mercy, a memoir by civil rights attorney Bryan Stevenson. Picoult described Nelson's views as "sinister" and "demeaning to women", and encouraged her followers on Twitter to "fight the patriarchy" in response to Nelson's comments. When the story was reported in Jezebel, The Guardian, The Washington Post, and Slate, Picoult posted an apology on Twitter, noting that her remarks had resulted in harassment and bullying of Nelson.

Advocacy 
In 2016, Picoult joined the advisory board of Vida: Women in Literary Arts, a "non-profit feminist organization committed to creating transparency around the lack of gender parity in the literary landscape and to amplifying historically-marginalized voices, including people of color; writers with disabilities; and queer, trans and gender nonconforming individuals". Picoult's website says that VIDA: Women in Literary Arts is a research-driven organization.

She was a member of the inaugural Writers Council of the National Writing Project in 2013, an organization which recognizes the "universality of writing as a communicative tool and helps teachers enhance student writing". This inaugural group consisted of 30 published authors.

She was a spokesperson for Positive Tracks, which empowers young people to fundraise through the power of athletics and partners with other charitable organizations.

In 2010, Picoult led the 5th Annual Children's Hospital at Dartmouth Hero Half Marathon & Relay 5K Walk around Occom Pond and through the town of Hanover, New Hampshire.

She is a member of the Advisory Committee for the New Hampshire Coalition Against the Death Penalty, an organization that successfully sought to end the death penalty in the state of New Hampshire through outreach, education and advocacy.

She was the co-founder, with Marjorie Rose, of the Trumbull Hall Troupe in 2004 as a means of providing children with a fun, educational theatre experience. Children from grade 6 through grade 12 audition to be in an original musical written by Picoult and composer Ellen Wilber. The proceeds are donated to local charities. The organization's contributions since its founding have exceeded $120,000.

On January 21, 2017, Picoult spoke at the New Hampshire Women's Day of Action and Unity in support of the Women's March on Washington.

Book banning 

In March 2023, 20 of Picoult's books were banned by Florida's Martin County School District. According to Picoult, the complaint was made by a sole parent who characterized her books as "adult romance", which Picoult has refuted, saying: "What [the books] do have, however, are issues like racism, abortion rights, gun control, gay rights, and other topics that encourage kids to think for themselves." Picoult called out Moms for Liberty for demanding the removal of her books.

Honors and awards
 New England Bookseller Award for Fiction (2003)
 Alex Award from the Young Adult Library Services Association (2005)
 Book Browse Diamond Award for novel of the year (2005) 
 Lifetime Achievement Award for mainstream fiction from the Romance Writers of America
 Fearless Fiction Award from Cosmopolitan magazine (2007) 
 Waterstone's Author of the Year (UK)
 Vermont Green Mountain Book Award (2007) 
 New Hampshire Granite State Book Award
 Virginia Reader's Choice Award (2007)
 Abraham Lincoln Illinois High School Book Award (2006) 
 Maryland Black-Eyed Susan Award (2007)
 New Hampshire Literary Award for Outstanding Literary Merit (2013–14)
 Princeton Alumni Weekly Our Most Influential Alumni list
Sarah Josepha Hale Award Medalist (2019)

Personal life
Picoult has been married, since 1989, to Timothy Warren van Leer, whom she met in college. They reside in Hanover, New Hampshire with their three children: Samantha, Kyle Ferreira, and Jake. Picoult has published two books with her daughter Samantha.

Recurring characters
 Jordan McAfee, his son Thomas, and his wife, Selena, are featured in the novels The Pact, Salem Falls, Nineteen Minutes, and Mad Honey (2022).
 Patrick Ducharme, a detective, is featured in Perfect Match and Nineteen Minutes. She has stated that she brought Patrick's character back for a second novel because she had a crush on him.
 Ian Fletcher of Keeping Faith makes a brief appearance in Change of Heart, published in 2008.
 Frankie Martine, first featured in Salem Falls, returns in Second Glance and Perfect Match.
 Nina Frost, a main character in Perfect Match, makes a cameo in Nineteen Minutes.
 Peter Houghton, a main character in Nineteen Minutes, is mentioned briefly in House Rules and Mad Honey.

"It's always great fun to bring a character back, because you get to catch up on his/her life; and you don’t have to reinvent the wheel—you already know how he speaks, acts, thinks."

Bibliography

 Songs of the Humpback Whale (1992)
 Harvesting the Heart (1993)
 Picture Perfect (1995)
 Mercy (1996)
 The Pact (1998)
 Keeping Faith (1999)
 Plain Truth (2001)
 Salem Falls (2001)
 Perfect Match (2002)
 Second Glance (2003)
 My Sister's Keeper (2004)
 Vanishing Acts (2005)
 The Tenth Circle (2006)
 Nineteen Minutes (2007)
 Wonder Woman (vol. 3) #6–10 (cover date: late May 2007 – August 2007)
 Wonder Woman: Love and Murder (2007) (hardcover volume collecting Wonder Woman #6–10)
 Change of Heart (2008)
 Handle with Care (2009)
 House Rules (2010)
 Leaving Home: Short Pieces (2011)
 Sing You Home (2011)
 Between the Lines, co-written with Samantha van Leer (2012)
 Lone Wolf (2012)
 The Storyteller (2013)
 Leaving Time (2014)
 Off the Page, co-written with Samantha van Leer (2015)
 Small Great Things (2016)
 A Spark of Light (2018)
The Book of Two Ways (2020)
 Wish You Were Here (2021)
 Mad Honey, co-written with Jennifer Finney Boylan (2022)

Film and television adaptations
The Pact (2002) (Lifetime Original Movie)
Plain Truth (2004) (Lifetime Original Movie)
The Tenth Circle (2008) (Lifetime Original Movie)
My Sister's Keeper (2009) (Feature film)
Salem Falls (2011) (Lifetime Original Movie)
Wish You Were Here (TBA) (Netflix Original film)

References

Sources
 Jewish Chronicle, April 27, 2007 p. 50: "The Jodi Picoult mystery"

External links

 

1966 births
20th-century American novelists
21st-century American novelists
American comics writers
American women novelists
American chick lit writers
Jewish American writers
Female comics writers
Harvard Graduate School of Education alumni
Living people
People from Hanover, New Hampshire
People from Nesconset, New York
Princeton University alumni
Novelists from New Hampshire
20th-century American women writers
21st-century American women writers
21st-century American Jews